Piz Duan is a mountain of the Oberhalbstein Range, overlooking Vicosoprano and the Val Bregaglia, in the Swiss canton of Graubünden.

References

External links
 Piz Duan on Hikr
 Piz Duan on Summitpost

Mountains of the Alps
Alpine three-thousanders
Mountains of Switzerland
Mountains of Graubünden
Bregaglia